Podgumer Col (‘Podgumerska Sedlovina’ \pod-gu-'mer-ska se-dlo-vi-'na\) is the mostly ice-free col of elevation over 800 m on Trinity Peninsula in Graham Land, Antarctica, which is linking Kondofrey Heights to the east to Detroit Plateau to the west.  It is surmounting the upper course of Victory Glacier to the north, and a tributary to Znepole Ice Piedmont to the south.

The col is named after the settlement of Podgumer in Western Bulgaria.

Location
German-British mapping in 1996.

Maps
 Trinity Peninsula. Scale 1:250000 topographic map No. 5697. Institut für Angewandte Geodäsie and British Antarctic Survey, 1996.
 Antarctic Digital Database (ADD). Scale 1:250000 topographic map of Antarctica. Scientific Committee on Antarctic Research (SCAR). Since 1993, regularly updated.

References
 Podgumer Col. SCAR Composite Antarctic Gazetteer
 Bulgarian Antarctic Gazetteer. Antarctic Place-names Commission. (details in Bulgarian, basic data in English)

External links
 Podgumer Col. Copernix satellite image

Mountain passes of Trinity Peninsula
Bulgaria and the Antarctic